In the early days of the Scottish Episcopal Church, college bishops were men who were consecrated bishops in order to maintain apostolic succession but (extraordinarily) not appointed to any episcopal see. Fourteen such men were consecrated, eight of whom were later appointed to Scottish sees.

List of college bishops

Notes

References

 
 
  
 

 
Scottish Episcopal Church
Bishops by type
Christian terminology